The Grey by-election of 1913 was a by-election held for  during the 18th New Zealand Parliament. As no candidate won an absolute majority on the first ballot on 17 July, a second round was held on 24 July. The seat had become vacant due to the death of Arthur Guinness. Three candidates contested the seat, and it was won by the left-wing candidate, who was elected on the second ballot with Liberal support.

Results
The following tables give the election results:

First ballot

Second ballot

References

Grey 1913
1913 elections in New Zealand
Politics of the West Coast, New Zealand